Cara Black and Elena Likhovtseva were the defending champions, but lost in semifinals to Martina Hingis and Barbara Schett.

Martina Hingis and Barbara Schett won the title by defeating Daniela Hantuchová and Arantxa Sánchez Vicario 6–1, 6–1 in the final.

Seeds

Draw

Draw

References
 Official Results Archive (ITF)
 Official Results Archive (WTA)

2002 WTA Tour